Krång Erik Gunnar Eriksson (13 September 1921 – 8 July 1982) was a Swedish cross-country skier who won two medals at the 1948 Winter Olympics, a gold in the 4 × 10 km relay and a bronze in the individual 18 km. Eriksson won the 50 km event at the 1950 FIS Nordic World Ski Championships, but finished 12th at the 1952 Olympics and 21st at the 1954 World Championships.

Eriksson had five brothers and three sisters. Their father died aged 42, and the children had to start working in their teens at the local knife factory; in 1946 they started their own hardware business. Eriksson married Kerstin Norlin, the winner of the 1949 Vasa ski marathon, who lived next door. She died aged 38. After retiring from competitions in 1954 Eriksson spent time collecting stamps, fishing, hunting and working as timberjack. In 1980 he developed Lou Gehrig’s disease and died in July 1982.

Cross-country skiing results
All results are sourced from the International Ski Federation (FIS).

Olympic Games
 2 medals – (1 gold, 1 bronze)

World Championships
 1 medal – (1 gold)

References

External links
 

1921 births
1982 deaths
People from Mora Municipality
Cross-country skiers from Dalarna County
Swedish male cross-country skiers
Olympic cross-country skiers of Sweden
Cross-country skiers at the 1948 Winter Olympics
Cross-country skiers at the 1952 Winter Olympics
Olympic gold medalists for Sweden
Olympic bronze medalists for Sweden
Olympic medalists in cross-country skiing
FIS Nordic World Ski Championships medalists in cross-country skiing
Medalists at the 1948 Winter Olympics